Crossover is the debut solo studio album by Yoshinori Sunahara. It was released on Ki/oon Records on September 1, 1995. Most of the album was created using samplers.

Critical reception

Charlie Porter of The Times gave the album a 7 out of 10, commenting that Sunahara's cover of Rah Band's "Clouds Across the Moon" is the best song on the album.

Track listing

References

External links
 

1995 debut albums
Yoshinori Sunahara albums
Ki/oon Records albums